Heshimu Jaramogi (October 17, 1952 - January 14, 2020) was a journalist known for his experience as a pioneer in multimedia journalism. One of his most popular outlets was his very own newspaper, "The Neighborhood Leader." He also wrote for The Philadelphia Inquirer and tried his hand at Philadelphia radio. His career spans forty years piquing as the president of the Philadelphia Association of Black Journalists.

Biography

Early life and education
Jaramogi was born in Philadelphia to James Henry Wilson Sr., Rosa Braxton Wilson, and (later) a younger sibling (unknown). He graduated from West Catholic High and earned his bachelor's degree from Northeastern Illinois University. Post-graduation, Jaramogi got involved with activism and took action to demonstrate his radical change, specifically changing his name from James Henry Wilson Jr. to his current Swahili moniker.

His 1980s radio career culminated in the development of Jaramogi Communications and involved his work as a WHYY producer, host of Let's Talk About It and stints at WDAS-FM (105.3) and WUSL (Power 99 FM). Heading into the 1990s, Jaramogi wrote for The Philadelphia Tribune, the Philadelphia Daily News, The Philadelphia Inquirer, and the Philadelphia New Observer. Further drawing on his activist influences, Jaramogi Communications campaigned with U.S. Senator Bob Casey, Gov. Tom Corbett, and the District Attorney Lynne Abraham. He worked as an adjunct professor at Temple University. In 2011, he was presented with a Lifetime Achievement Award from the Philadelphia Association of Black Journalists (PABJ).

Jaramogi's formative years informed his career moves. He was raised under catholic beliefs so influential that he aspired to be a priest. The religious orientation of concern for our neighbor's wellbeing inspired his choice of majors at Northeastern Illinois University, Political Science with an emphasis on Inner City Studies. It also motivated him to run for president of the field's Student Organization, The Jacob H. Carruthers Center. The center's investment in Chicago communities propelled him into activism that would come to animate much of his professional life through politics.

Journalism and radio career
Post Northeastern Illinois University, Jaramogi's short stint as an NPR reporter unlocked his interest in working behind the scenes, reporting, and, eventually, producing. In an interview with E. Stevens Collins and Karen Warrington, it is revealed that Jaramogi impressed the staff so much with his report on a woman who was wrongly accused of robbing a Brinks truck that they invited him to apply for a position.

At WDAS (80s), Jaramogi worked as a producer and host for his own radio talk show, Let's Talk About It. From 1986–88, he covered city government and general assignments on WPEN-AM. He was a general reporter for WCAU AM. His colleagues spoke highly of him. Karen Warrington said, "Heshimu was a solid media professional...He was a cultural brother whose African-centric point of view informed him as a communicator."

Jaramogi was part of the Community Development Institute from 1992–3. He took his journalism experience to the classroom as an adjunct professor at Temple University, Foothill College, and The University of Pennsylvania. At this time, he ventured into multimedia and created Jaramogi Communications, which popularized multimedia news and reporting in the late 90s. He was a one-man operation with proficiencies in film, audio, and other media platforms. He was president of Jaramogi Communications for 22 years before moving on to Clear Channel Communications from 2005–07, which brought him back to WDAS AM & FM, WUSL (Power 99 FM) and WJJZ. He had a brief stint as media consultant for the AFSCME District Council 47.

References

American male journalists
1952 births
2020 deaths
African-American journalists
The Philadelphia Inquirer people
Northeastern Illinois University alumni
Swahili culture
Temple University faculty
NPR personalities
University of Pennsylvania faculty
Journalists from Pennsylvania
Writers from Philadelphia
20th-century African-American people
21st-century African-American people